Uranus is a 1990 French comedy-drama film with Gérard Depardieu about post-World War II recovery in a small French village, as the controlling French Communist Party tries to dispose of Pétain loyalists.

It was directed and written by Claude Berri and Arlette Langmann, based on a novel by Marcel Aymé. The film was entered into the 41st Berlin International Film Festival.

Cast
 Michel Blanc - Gaigneux 
 Gérard Depardieu - Léopold Lajeunesse
 Jean-Pierre Marielle - Archambaud
 Philippe Noiret - Watrin
 Gérard Desarthe - Maxime Loin
 Michel Galabru - Monglat
 Danièle Lebrun - Mrs. Archambaud
 Fabrice Luchini - Jourdan
 Daniel Prévost - Rochard
 Myriam Boyer - Mrs. Gaigneux
 Ticky Holgado - Mégrin, lawyer
 Vincent Grass - Ledieu
 Florence Darel - Miss Archambaud
 Yves Afonso

Reception
The film opened at number one at the Paris box office with a first week gross of 4.9 million Franc ($1 million) from 48 screens.

References

External links
 
 

1990 films
1990 comedy-drama films
French comedy-drama films
1990s French-language films
Films based on French novels
Films based on works by Marcel Aymé
Films directed by Claude Berri
Films set in 1945
Films with screenplays by Claude Berri
Vichy France in fiction
1990s French films